Lepidosperma oldfieldii is a sedge (in the family Cyperaceae) that is native to Tasmania. It was first described in 1860 by Joseph Hooker.

Hooker says of the species that  it is similar to L. elatius, but  smaller and more slender "with a different panicle, which is very long (6-18 inches), and .... covered with fascicled chesnut-brown spikelets. ... The spikelets have a subsquarrose appearance. The edges of the culms are very scabrous, and cut severely."

References

Plants described in 1860
Flora of Tasmania
angustatum
Taxa named by Joseph Dalton Hooker